"You Decorated My Life" is a song written by Debbie Hupp and Bob Morrison, and recorded by American country music artist Kenny Rogers.  It was released in September 1979 as the lead single from his album Kenny.  It was a number-one hit on the Billboard Country Singles chart, and peaked at number seven on the Billboard Hot 100.

Cash Box said that "Rogers' smooth, sincere vocal reading here is once again up to his usual high standards."

Chart performance

References

1979 singles
Kenny Rogers songs
Song recordings produced by Larry Butler (producer)
United Artists Records singles
Songs written by Debbie Hupp
1979 songs
Songs written by Bob Morrison (songwriter)